The Kris Sakti (English: Magic Dagger) is the aerobatic display team of the Royal Malaysian Air Force (RMAF). It made its debut in 2011 at the biennial Langkawi International Maritime and Air Show (LIMA).

History
Prior to the founding of the team, the Royal Malaysian Air Force had another aerobatic team, "Taming Sari" that performed aerobatic performances during air shows such as LIMA with the RMAF's Pilatus PC-7 trainers, MiG-29N Fulcrum air superiority fighters and Su-30MKM Flanker-H multirole fighters.

Aircraft
During its debut on LIMA 2011, they operated four German Extra 300L aerobatic monoplane aircraft.

References
 https://web.archive.org/web/20111120013956/http://www.nst.com.my/local/general/kris-sakti-team-sets-to-blaze-langkawi-skies-1.4595

Aerobatic teams
Royal Malaysian Air Force